New Buda Township is a township in Decatur County, Iowa, USA.  As of the 2000 census, its population was 270.

History
The name New Buda is derived from Buda, now the part of Budapest, given by the Hungarian and Romanian immigrants who settled there.

Geography
New Buda Township covers an area of 25.28 square miles (65.47 square kilometers); of this, 0.09 square miles (0.23 square kilometers) or 0.35 percent, is water. The stream of Dickersons Branch runs through this township.

Cities and towns
 Davis City (southwest quarter)

Unincorporated towns
 New Buda
 Togo (historical)
(This list is based on USGS data and may include former settlements.)

Adjacent townships
 Burrell Township (north)
 Eden Township (northeast)
 Hamilton Township (east)
 Fayette Township (west)
 Lamoni Township (west)
 Bloomington Township (northwest)

Cemeteries
The township contains two cemeteries: Creveling and New Buda.

Major highways
 Interstate 35
 U.S. Route 69

See also 
 George Pomutz

References
 U.S. Board on Geographic Names (GNIS)
 United States Census Bureau cartographic boundary files

External links
 US-Counties.com
 City-Data.com

Townships in Decatur County, Iowa
Townships in Iowa